Robert Wright (November 20, 1752September 7, 1826) was an American politician and soldier who fought in the American Revolutionary War.

Early life
Wright was born at Narborough, near Chestertown, Maryland, and attended the Kent Free School (later Washington College) of Chestertown. He studied law, was admitted to the bar in 1773, and commenced practice in Chestertown.

Career
He served in the Maryland militia during the American Revolutionary War as private, lieutenant, and later as captain.  After the war, he served as a member of the Maryland House of Delegates from 1784 to 1786, and as a member of the Maryland State Senate in 1801.

In 1800, Wright was elected as a Democratic Republican to the United States Senate on November 19, 1801, for the term commencing March 4, 1801.  In the Senate, Wright served as delegate to the Farmers’ National Convention in 1803. He resigned from the Senate on November 12, 1806, having been elected the 12th Governor of Maryland, a position he served in from 1806 to 1809.

After his tenure as governor, Wright served as clerk of Queen Anne's County, Maryland in 1810, and was elected to the Eleventh and Twelfth Congresses to fill the vacancy caused by the resignation of John Brown. He was re-elected to the Thirteenth and Fourteenth Congresses and served from November 29, 1810, to March 3, 1817. He was an unsuccessful candidate for reelection in 1816 to the Fifteenth Congress, but was elected to the Seventeenth Congress, serving from March 4, 1821 to March 3, 1823.  He was not a candidate for renomination in 1822.

In his later life, Wright served as district judge of the lower Eastern Shore district of Maryland from 1823 until his death.

Wright owned slaves.

Personal life
Wright was married to Sarah De Courcy. Together, they were the parents of:

 William Henry De Courcy Wright (1795–1864), who married Eliza Lee (née Warner) Wright (1800–1864), the widow of Samuel Turbutt Wright, the 2nd Adjutant General of Maryland.

Wright died on September 7, 1826 at Blakeford in Queen Anne's County.  He is interred in the private burying ground of the DeCourcy family at Cheston-on-Wye in Queen Anne's County.

See also 
 Widehall (1769-1770), a mansion in Chestertown, Maryland. Wright's home from 1801 to 1822.

References

External links
 
 A picture of the Historical Marker commemorating Governor Robert Wright
 A picture of the Cheston-on-Wye Historical Marker, where Wright was buried

1752 births
1826 deaths
Maryland state court judges
Maryland militiamen in the American Revolution
Governors of Maryland
Maryland state senators
Members of the Maryland House of Delegates
United States senators from Maryland
Washington College alumni
People from Chestertown, Maryland
Democratic-Republican Party United States senators
Democratic-Republican Party members of the United States House of Representatives from Maryland
Democratic-Republican Party state governors of the United States